Jesse Baker (born Michael Myron Silverman, March 4, 1895 – July 29, 1976) was a professional baseball player who played shortstop in the Major Leagues in  for the Washington Senators. In his only major league game, he was injured when Ty Cobb spiked him when he slid into second base.

He was born in Cleveland, Ohio and died in West Los Angeles, California, and was Jewish.

References

External links

Major League Baseball shortstops
Washington Senators (1901–1960) players
Baseball players from Cleveland
Jewish American baseball players
Jewish Major League Baseball players
1895 births
1976 deaths
20th-century American Jews